Borcut may refer to the following places in Romania:

Borcut, a village in the town Târgu Lăpuș, Maramureș County
Borcut (Săsar), a river in Maramureș County
Borcut, a tributary of the Someșul Mare in Bistrița-Năsăud County